Krasnaya Nov is a rural locality (a khutor) in Nizhnereutchansky Selsoviet Rural Settlement, Medvensky District, Kursk Oblast, Russia. Population:

Geography 
The khutor is located 66 km from the Russia–Ukraine border, 27 km south-west of Kursk, 5 km north-west of the district center – the urban-type settlement Medvenka, 11.5 km from the selsoviet center – Nizhny Reutets.

 Climate
Krasnaya Nov has a warm-summer humid continental climate (Dfb in the Köppen climate classification).

Transport 
Krasnaya Nov is located 0.5 km from the federal route  Crimea Highway (a part of the European route ), 20 km from the nearest railway halt and passing loop 454 km (railway line Lgov I — Kursk).

The rural locality is situated 35 km from Kursk Vostochny Airport, 96 km from Belgorod International Airport and 221 km from Voronezh Peter the Great Airport.

References

Notes

Sources

Rural localities in Medvensky District